KVWM is a commercial Talk radio station in Show Low, Arizona, broadcasting on 970 AM and owned by Petracom of Holbrook, LLC (a subsidiary of Petracom Media).

History
The first words on KVWM were spoken by station founder "Woody" Woodworth, on May 17, 1957. The station was originally an Easy Listening station, and later changed to an Oldies format. In 2004, the Oldies format was moved to another Petracom station, KSNX, and KVWM began simulcasting the NewsTalk format that is still carried on the station today.

External links
 KVWM Website

VWM
Mogollon Rim
White Mountains (Arizona)
1957 establishments in Arizona
Radio stations established in 1957